Woodland Cemetery (also known as West Newark Cemetery or the German Cemetery) is a  burial ground located at 670 South 10th Street in the city of Newark, New Jersey.  Established in 1855 and active until the 1980s, the cemetery served the city's German immigrant population and their descendants, and later a large number of Greek immigrant and African-American graves.

History
Since the 1960s and the urban decline of Newark, many of the descendants of the German immigrants and families buried here moved away from the city.  Because of the state of the neighborhood, Woodland Cemetery has experienced vandalism and the toppling of several thousand gravestones.  For many years, it was neglected and fell into disrepair.  Recently, the burial ground's cemetery association was reorganized with a mission to manage and restore the cemetery and has organized efforts with local community groups and with descendants of the families buried at Woodland.

Notable burials
Ike Quebec (1918–1963), tenor saxophonist and jazz musician

References

External links
 Woodland Cemetery at Newark Cemeteries
 Newarkology (Newark History)
 

1855 establishments in New Jersey
Cemeteries in Newark, New Jersey
Geography of Newark, New Jersey
German-American culture in New Jersey